Model Behavior is a 2000 television film that aired on ABC's The Wonderful World of Disney anthology series. The film starred Maggie Lawson, Justin Timberlake in his film debut, and Kathie Lee Gifford, and was directed by Mark Rosman. It is based on the book Janine and Alex, Alex and Janine by Michael Graubart Levin.  It is also a modern-day gender-bending take on the story The Prince & The Pauper by Mark Twain.

Summary
Alex Burroughs is a shy, insecure teenage girl who dreams of becoming a fashion designer. While helping her father with his catering business at a party, she meets beautiful Janine Adams, a famous teen model.

Meanwhile, Janine is fed up with her manager mother making her life nothing but work. Especially after not being home when she has her first book signing, because her younger brother Max is going on a publicity tour. Through a strange coincidence, the girls meet and realize that they look identical to each other (the only real difference being that Alex has to wear glasses). Through this realization, Alex and Janine decide to swap places for a while. Alex gets to date Jason Sharp (Justin Timberlake), a young, gorgeous, but sweet, male model, while Janine gets a date with Eric Singer, the most popular guy in Alex’s school. However, she has to deal with Janine's domineering mother, Deirdre (Kathie Lee Gifford).

When they start their new life, they both end up with dates for Saturday. Even though they were supposed to change back Friday, they call each other up and extend the date. Janine warns Alex to stay away from Jason because she believes that he is using her for the attention. Meanwhile, Alex warns Janine to stay away from Eric Singer. Alex's younger brother Josh tries to reveal her "Janine" secret. Towards the end when Alex wants to tell Jason that she is not Janine, but she is seen by Eric and he thinks she's cheating on him. Jason walks off on her as well. So Janine and Alex swap back the next morning. Alex is grounded but she goes to the ball and so does Janine, disguising herself as Alex. After both families show up, everyone finds out their secret. The two are able to convince their families to not be so hard on them and Eric leaves the most popular girl in school, Mindy, to be with Janine. Jason shows up having seen Josh's tape which Alex sent to him to show him the truth and dances with her.

Cast
Maggie Lawson as Alex Burroughs/Janine Adams
Justin Timberlake as Jason Sharpe
Kathie Lee Gifford as Deirdre Adams
Cody Gifford as Max Adams
Daniel Clark as Josh Burroughs
Jim Abele as Ted Burroughs
Karen Hines as Monique
Jesse Nilsson as Eric Singer
Vendela Kirsebom as herself
Jake Steinfeld as himself
Nobody's Angel as Themselves
Lisa Ng as Sharon
Ramona Pringle as Mindy Kaylis
Ann Turnbull as Mrs. Burroughs
Nobody's Angel was featured during the prom scene.

Crew
Directed by Mark Rosman
Writing credits
 Michael Levin - Janine & Alex, Alex & Janine book
Matt Roshkow - teleplay
Produced by
Jack Brodsky - co-producer
Mike Carz - executive producer

Soundtrack
"Here We Go" sung by *NSYNC (JC Chasez and Justin Timberlake)
"Hello World" Performed by Belle Perez
"Walking on Sunshine" Performed by Katrina & the Waves
"Power to the Meek" Performed by Eurythmics
"Let That Be Enough" Performed by Switchfoot
"If You Wanna Dance" Performed by Nobody's Angel
"Ooh La La La" Performed by Nobody's Angel
"Wishing on You" Performed by Nobody's Angel
"I Can't Help Myself" Performed by Nobody's Angel
"Beautiful Thing" Performed by All Star United

References

External links

2000 television films
2000 films
American teen comedy films
Disney television films
Films directed by Mark Rosman
Films about fashion
Films based on books
2000s American films
ABC network original films